The Aggie Yell Leaders are a group of Texas A&M University students that lead Aggie fans in a series of "yells" during athletic events or other school events.  The Yell Leaders are composed of five students (three seniors and two juniors) who are elected annually by popular vote of the student body.

The Yell Leaders use a variety of hand signals, called "pass-backs," to direct and intensify the crowds. Notable former Aggie Yell Leaders include former Texas Governor and Secretary of Energy Rick Perry, trauma surgeon Dr. Red Duke and Texas State Representative Trent Ashby.

History
The Yell Leader tradition dates to 1907.  According to A&M lore, the Aggies were being soundly defeated and a large number of women who had taken the train from Texas Woman's University in Denton were threatening to leave.  The upperclassmen ordered the freshmen to find a way to keep the women entertained.  Several freshmen sneaked into a maintenance closet and changed into white coveralls. They then began leading the crowd in yells and telling jokes from the track in front of the stands. It was an instant hit and was quickly incorporated into the gameday repertoire for the Aggies.  However, the freshmen became a little too popular with the ladies and "it was decided that only upperclassmen would be allowed to participate in this entertainment in the future."  While usually a position held by members of the Corps of Cadets, non-Corps students have been elected to the position.  Ricky Wood, class of 2001, became the first non-corps Head Yell Leader in 2000–2001.

In the early 1990s, the student body elected its first African American yell leader, Ronnie McDonald, Class of 1993. In 1999, McDonald became the youngest African American to become a county judge in the history of Texas. Arouna "Boo Boo" Davies Jr., Class of 2002, became the second African American yell leader. In another exception, neither was a member of the Corps of Cadets.

Current tradition

Personnel
The Aggie Yell Leaders are composed of three seniors and two juniors, with one senior designated as "Head Yell Leader."  They are elected annually, making A&M one of the few schools that still elects spirit leaders. Sometimes, more than twice as many students vote for yell leader candidates than vote in the Student Body President elections.  Traditionally, the Yell Leaders are members of the Texas A&M University Corps of Cadets in keeping with A&M's military history, though "non-reg" students have occasionally earned election. The first "non-reg" elected as Yell Leader was John David Garner, class of 1961. Although women have campaigned for Yell Leader at the main Texas A&M campus in College Station, none have ever been elected. In 2005, however, a female was elected as Junior Yell Leader at Texas A&M University at Galveston, which is an extension school of the main campus in College Station.

NCAA rules prevent the Yell Leaders from participating in athletic practices, but the Head Yell Leader can usually be found during two-a-days, running and lifting alongside the football team.  The Yell Leaders, along with junior and senior cadets of the Fightin' Texas Aggie Band, and Seniors of the Fightin' Texas Aggie Singing Cadets are the only students on campus who receive a varsity letter without playing a sport.

The Yell Leaders attend all home and away football games, all home basketball games, some away basketball games, and selected home and away games for other sporting events. The 2019-2020 yell leaders are Head Yell Leader Karsten Lowe '20, Senior Yell Leaders Reid Williams '20 and Kenny Cantrell '20 and Junior Yell Leaders Keller Cox '21 and Jacob Huffman '21.

Football-specific traditions

Besides their game-day duties, the Aggie Yell leaders are the Masters of Ceremonies at the Aggie pep-rally-type event known as Midnight Yell Practice.  This event is held the night before a football game, at midnight, at Kyle Field for home games or at a designated location in the opposing team's city for away games.  During these events, the Aggie Yell Leaders tell stories about ways in which "Ol' Rock" the prototypical Aggie defeats the upcoming opponents' mascots and lead the crowds in yells, so that all attendees know what to do in the coming game. They lead an additional, smaller, Yell Practice on the Thursday night before all away games (even bowl games), called Arch Yell, which is held in front of the 12 arches at the entryway to the Corps of Cadets quad area.

At the various yell practices, the Aggie Yell Leaders wear either maroon (seniors) or white (juniors) T-shirts and denim overalls that they decorate with maroon paint, often featuring their graduation year and various depictions of the A&M traditions. During sporting events, they always wear a white button-down shirt and white pants.

During a game, the Yell Leaders signal the crowd to start a yell by flashing pass backs. Once the signal is passed throughout the crowd, the Yell Leaders give the signal for the crowd to "hump it," or lean forward with hands just above their knees, and the yell begins. The theory behind "humpin' it" is that it aligns the back, neck and throat in the proper position to maximize the noise. They also use pass backs to signal when to sing the various school songs, in much the same way as cheerleaders lead songs at other schools.

When the Aggie football team is defeated at home, the crowd remains in the stands at the end of the game while the Aggie Yell Leaders conduct a short yell practice, including the singing of the song 12th Man, in preparation for the next week's game.  If the Aggies win a home football game, the freshmen in the Corps of Cadets chase them around Kyle Field behind the 20 yard line, and, once they are captured, carry them across campus and toss them into Fish Pond, a fountain full of cold water.  Meanwhile, the Aggie fans follow the Aggie Band as they leave Kyle Field and congregate in front of the Sbisa Dining Center, the current location of Fish Pond, for another Yell Practice. After the last Yell Leader has been thrown into Fish Pond, the soaking-wet Yell Leaders lead the fans in a yell practice against the following week's opponent.

Pass-backs

References

External links
Texas Aggie Yell Leaders
A&M Traditions

Texas A&M University traditions
American college cheerleading squads
Performing groups established in the 1900s
University folklore